Anca Măroiu (née Băcioiu, born 5 August 1983) is a Romanian épée fencer. She is double team world champion, in 2010 and 2011, silver medallist at the 2012 European Fencing Championships and three-time European team champion (2006, 2009 and 2011).

Career
Măroiu first took up gymnastics, but found herself too tall in primary school. She switched to fencing, learning under Nicolae Mihăilescu, then Mircea Alecu. Being of a combative temperament, she chose épée, the weapon of the duel. When she was 14 years old she was selected into the national training centre for juniors within the Petrache Trișcu sports high school in Craiova under Dan Podeanu's coaching.

She won the team bronze medal at the 2002 Junior European Championships in Conegliano. At the 2006 European Championships in İzmir she reached the semifinals, where she was defeated by Germany's Claudia Bokel and came away with a bronze medal. In the team event, Romania overcame the Czech Republic, Estonia and Russia. They defeated Hungary by a single hit in the final, winning the first European title in the history of Romanian épée fencing. They won the European Championships again in 2009 and 2011.

With Ana Maria Brânză, Loredana Dinu and Simona Gherman, Măroiu won the 2010 World Championships in Paris after they defeated Germany in the final. The following year, she reached the semifinals in the individual event, but lost on priority to Li Na of China. In the team event Romania retained their crown after prevailing over China in the final.

In 2012 Măroiu reached the final at the European Championships in Legnano. She could not win against teammate Gherman and came away with a silver medal. She competed in the 2012 Summer Olympics. After seeing off Ukraine's Olena Kryvytska and Russia's Anna Sivkova she fell to South Korea's Shin A-lam in the quarter-finals. In the team event, top seeded Romania suffered a surprise defeat to South Korea and finished sixth after the placement matches. After this failure she, Gherman and Dinu decided to take a break in their career to look after their families.

In 2014 Măroiu gave birth to a son, Petre Luca. She announced her return to competition in early 2015.

References

External links

 
  (archive)
 
 

1983 births
Living people
Romanian female fencers
Fencers at the 2012 Summer Olympics
Olympic fencers of Romania
Romanian sportswomen
Sportspeople from Craiova
Romanian épée fencers
20th-century Romanian women
21st-century Romanian women